Events in the year 2014 in Monaco.

Incumbents 
 Monarch: Albert II
 State Minister: Michel Roger

Events 
 January – AS Monaco FC was victorious in three rounds of the Coupe de France, then defeating RC Lens in the quarter-finals, but ultimately losing to En Avant de Guingamp in the semi-finals.
 6 May – Hélène Pastor, a Monegasque billionaire real estate businesswoman and the richest woman in the principality, is assassinated in Nice, France. Pastor died of her injuries on May 21.
 10 December – Charlene, Princess of Monaco, wife of Albert II, Prince of Monaco, gives birth to twins Jacques and Gabriella. Jacques will be heir apparent in line with male priority of Monaco's succession laws.

Deaths

See also 

 2014 in Europe
 City states

References 

 
Years of the 21st century in Monaco
2010s in Monaco
Monaco
Monaco